Uttar Satali  is a census town in the Kalchini CD block in the Alipurduar subdivision of the Alipurduar district  in the state of West Bengal, India.

Geography

Location

Area overview
Alipurduar district is covered by two maps. It is an extensive area in the eastern end of the Dooars in West Bengal. It is undulating country, largely forested, with numerous rivers flowing down from the outer ranges of the Himalayas in Bhutan. It is a predominantly rural area with 79.38% of the population living in the rural areas. The district has 1 municipal town and 20 census towns and that means that 20.62% of the population lives in the urban areas. The scheduled castes and scheduled tribes, taken together, form more than half the population in all the six community development blocks in the district. There is a high concentration of tribal people (scheduled tribes) in the three northern blocks of the district.

Note: The map alongside presents some of the notable locations in the subdivision. All places marked in the map are linked in the larger full screen map.

Demographics
As per the 2011 Census of India, Uttar Satali had a total population of 18,454.  There were 14,405 (78%) males and 4,049 (22%) females. There were 1,594 persons in the age range of 0 to 6 years. The total number of literate people in Uttar Satali was 1,642 (97.40% of the population over 6 years).

Infrastructure
According to the District Census Handbook 2011, Jalpaiguri, Uttar Satali covered an area of 4.9089 km2. Among the civic amenities, the protected water supply involved overhead tank, tap water from untreated sources. It had 1,375 domestic electric connections, 200 road lighting point. Among the medical facilities it had 1 hospital, 1 maternity & child welfare centre. Among the educational facilities it had 1 primary school, 1 middle school, 1 secondary school, 1 senior secondary school, the nearest general degree college at Alipurduar 35 km away. It had office of 1 nationalised bank.

Healthcare
There is a primary health centre, with 4 beds, at Satali (PO Satali Mondalpur).

References

Cities and towns in Alipurduar district